1980 in Namibia refers to events that occurred in Namibia (also known as South West Africa) during 1980.

Military
Operation Sceptic is launched during the South African Border War against SWAPO. 

The South West African Territorial Force, an auxiliary of the South African Defence Force (SADF), is formed on August 1. Conscription for all 18+ year old Namibians is put in place.

Politics
 1 July: Cornelius Cloete, a member of the Democratic Turnhalle Alliance (DTA), becomes the first leader of the newly founded Namaland.
 5 December: Thimoteus Tjamuaha replaces Kuaima Riruako as the leader of Hereroland.
 October: Rev. Cornelius Ndjoba resigns as leader of the DTA.

Births
 11 March: Beata Naigambo
 22 March: Sherwin Vries
 13 July: Jeremiah Baisako
 6 August: Paulus Ambunda
 9 August: Jurie van Tonder
 10 August: Riaan Walters
 13 August: Hilaria Johannes
 8 October: Günther von Hundelshausen

References

Years of the 20th century in Namibia
 
Namibia